Minnesota: A History of the Land is an album by Peter Ostroushko, released in 2005. It is the original score to a four-part public television series aired in 2005.

Ostroushko received a "regional" Emmy award for the soundtrack.

Track listing 
All songs by Peter Ostroushko.
"Uncommon Ground" – 3:44
"Glaciers" – 2:58
"The Land to Which We Belong" – 3:14
"After the Buffalo Hunt / Metis" – 3:40
"St. Anthony Falls" – 3:05
"King of the Northern Forest" – 2:31
"Lumberjack's Waltz" – 3:03
"White Pine Elegy" – 3:15
"Hinckley Fire Trilogy" – 3:49
"Once in the Prairie Tall Grass" – 3:48
"Plowman's Reel" – 3:05
"Psalm of the Prairie" – 4:48
"Crane's Slow Drag" – 3:40
"Mill City Rag" – 2:34
"Swede Hollow Lament" – 3:49
"The Crooked Man's Jig" – 2:35
"Mallard Island Hymn" – 3:26
"North of the Prairie Stars" – 4:34
"Dancin in the Mississippi Mud" – 3:51
"Lord, In Thy Bosom We Will Rest" – 3:12

Personnel
Peter Ostroushko – mandolin, fiddle
Joel Sayles – bass
Diane Tremaine – cello
Dirk Freymuth – guitar
Laura MacKenzie – bagpipes, flute, concertina, tin whistle
Bruce Allard – violin, viola
Marc Anderson – percussion
Richard Dworsky – piano

Production notes
Peter Ostroushko – producer, arranger, liner notes, mixing
Sam Hudson – engineer, mixing
Richard Hamilton Smith – photography, cover photo
Ann Marsden – photography

References

External links
[ Allmusic entry with track list.]

Peter Ostroushko albums
2005 soundtrack albums
Television soundtracks
Red House Records albums